Jussi Tolonen (11 June 1882, Karttula – 11 March 1962) was a Finnish smallholder and politician. He served as a Member of the Parliament of Finland from 1913 to 1917, from 1919 to 1924 and from 1927 to 1951, representing the Social Democratic Party of Finland (SDP).

References

1882 births
1962 deaths
People from Karttula
People from Kuopio Province (Grand Duchy of Finland)
Social Democratic Party of Finland politicians
Members of the Parliament of Finland (1913–16)
Members of the Parliament of Finland (1916–17)
Members of the Parliament of Finland (1917–19)
Members of the Parliament of Finland (1919–22)
Members of the Parliament of Finland (1922–24)
Members of the Parliament of Finland (1927–29)
Members of the Parliament of Finland (1929–30)
Members of the Parliament of Finland (1930–33)
Members of the Parliament of Finland (1933–36)
Members of the Parliament of Finland (1936–39)
Members of the Parliament of Finland (1939–45)
Members of the Parliament of Finland (1945–48)
Members of the Parliament of Finland (1948–51)
Finnish people of World War II